Folifer brevifilis is a species of cyprinid fish found in China, Vietnam, Laos, Thailand and Myanmar in eastern Asia.

References 

Cyprinid fish of Asia
Fish described in 1881
Taxa named by Wilhelm Peters